Anegunta, also spelled Anigunta, is a village in Zahirabad Mandal of  Medak district in Telangana, India.

Demographics
The population of the village is 2502 people (1300 male, 1200 female) as of 2011. The literacy rate was 65 percent, more than India's national average. A large portion of the population is composed of tribes who settled in tandas.

References

Villages in Medak district